The Bell or Die Glocke may refer to:

Print media
 The Bell (magazine), an Irish literary magazine published in 1940–1954
 "The Bell", a poem by Ralph Waldo Emerson
 The Bell (novel), a 1958 novel by Iris Murdoch
 Die Glocke (magazine), a German socialist journal edited by Max Beer from 1919 to 1921
 Kolokol (newspaper) (Bell), a Russian and French language newspaper published in London (1857–1865) and Geneva (1865–1867)

Songs
 "The Bell" (song), a song by Mike Oldfield
 "The Bell", an anti-war song and title song of the 2002 album by Stephan Smith

Other uses
 The Bell (TV series), a 1982 British television series 
 Die Glocke (conspiracy theory), a conspiracy theory originating in 2000 about a secret weapon supposedly created by Third Reich scientists
 Die Glocke (Bremen), a concert house in Bremen, Germany
 Dundonald Bluebell F.C., a football club in Scotland, nickname The Bell
 "Die Glocke", an episode of 12 Monkeys

See also
 The Bells (disambiguation)
 Bell (disambiguation)